National Science Museum may refer to:

Science Museum (London)
National Science Museum of Japan
National Science Museum, South Korea, South Korea
Gwacheon National Science Museum, South Korea
National Science Museum, South Korea
National Science Museum (Thailand)